Rex Arthur "Barney" Jorgensen (12 July 1922 – 28 October 2001) was an Australian rules footballer who played for the Hawthorn Football Club and St Kilda Football Club in the Victorian Football League (VFL).

Notes

External links 

Barney Jorgensen's playing statistics from The VFA Project

1922 births
2001 deaths
Australian rules footballers from Victoria (Australia)
Hawthorn Football Club players
St Kilda Football Club players
Camberwell Football Club players